Cheshmeh Dozdan (also Romanized as Cheshmeh Dozdān and Chashmeh-e Dozdān) is a village in Sornabad Rural District, Hamaijan District, Sepidan County, Fars Province, Iran. At the 2006 census, its population was 27, in 6 families.

References 

Populated places in Sepidan County